Brave Belt was a Canadian rock band from Winnipeg, Manitoba originally consisting of Randy Bachman (guitar/vocals), his former Guess Who bandmate, Chad Allan (vocals/keyboards), and Randy's brother Robbie (drums). Randy also provided bass tracks for the recording of the band's first album, Brave Belt (Reprise Records, 1971). But C. F. "Fred" Turner was added shortly after as bassist for the supporting concerts.

The band made the Canadian Top 40 with the minor hit "Crazy Arms, Crazy Eyes," which peaked at No. 35 in November 1971.  However, they missed the U.S. charts completely.

In 1972, Turner became the lead vocalist for the Brave Belt II album. Allan left the band after the recording was completed. During the supporting concerts for Brave Belt II, Tim Bachman was added as a second guitarist. Despite the changes, Brave Belt II sold poorly and the band struggled to book live shows. In a 1974 Rolling Stone interview, Randy estimated there were losses of about $150,000 in 1971-72 ($923,000 in 2020 dollars), with himself personally absorbing about 60% of the loss, as he was paying the other band member salaries from his Guess Who royalties.

Although dropped from the Reprise label, the Brave Belt II lineup (C. F. Turner with Randy, Tim and Robbie Bachman) recorded and shopped around a demo that was supposed to be a Brave Belt III album.  New management convinced them to change their name − they eventually settled on Bachman–Turner Overdrive.

Thus, the eponymous first Bachman–Turner Overdrive album is essentially Brave Belt III, the album that was rejected by Reprise Records. Bachman had contacted many record labels to get the Brave Belt III tapes signed.  Charlie Fach at Mercury eventually listened to the tapes and liked what he heard. Bachman listened to some suggestions, remixed and re-edited the tapes, and the band recorded at least two new songs. The result was the first Bachman–Turner Overdrive album for Mercury, released in May 1973.

Though Brave Belt is relatively unknown some 40 years later, the importance of the band was summed up by Randy Bachman in a 2001 interview:
"It was an innocent time of soul-searching. Nobody would play with me when I left The Guess Who. I was completely black-listed. I couldn't get a decent musician to play with me, except Chad Allan, who had also been in The Guess Who and left. He and I bonded together, and I might not have gotten started without him, even though he left sometime after that first album. Those [Brave Belt] albums are so important to me because, for the first time, I was making my own music, paying for it, finding strengths in it, and going through the process of finding the right music for the record. It led to me becoming a stronger producer for BTO."

Brave Belt I and Brave Belt II were re-released on a single CD March 17, 2009.

Albums

Brave Belt - Reprise Records - 1971

Track listing 
Side One
 "Crazy Arms, Crazy Eyes" - (Randy Bachman) - 2:44
 "Lifetime" - (Randy Bachman) - 1:53
 "Waitin' There For Me" - (Randy Bachman) - 3:17
 "I Am The Man" - (Chad Allan) - 4:03
 "French Kiss" - (Chad Allan, Rob Matheson) - 3:46
 "It's Over" - (Randy Bachman) - 3:05
Side Two
 "Rock And Roll Band" - (Chad Allan) - 3:52
 "Wandering Fantasy Girl" - (Chad Allan) - 2:50
 "I Wouldn't Trade My Guitar For A Woman" - (Chad Allan) - 1:47
 "Holy Train" - (Chad Allan) - 3:05
 "Anyday Means Tomorrow" - (Randy Bachman) - 3:02
 "Scarecrow" - (Chad Allan, Rob Matheson) - 5:38

Personnel 
 Chad Allan - piano, lead (4, 5, 8, 10, 12), co-lead (1, 2, 7, 9) and backing (11) vocals, accordion, rhythm guitar, mandolin
 Randy Bachman - lead guitar, lead (3, 6, 11), co-lead (1, 2, 7, 9) and backing vocals, bass, herzog
 Robbie Bachman - drums (1-8, 10, 11), percussion
Additional Personnel
 Wally Didduck - fiddle
 Ron Halldorson - pedal steel guitar
 Billy Mac - drums (9, 12)

Brave Belt II - Reprise Records - 1972

Track listing 
Side One
 "Too Far Away" - (Randy Bachman) - 3:38
 "Dunrobin's Gone" - (Chad Allan, Bob Ericson) - 3:10
 "Can You Feel It" - (C. F. Turner) - 2:36
 "Put It In A Song" - (C. F. Turner, Tim Bachman) - 3:34
 "Summer Soldier" - (Chad Allan, Randy Bachman, Robbie Bachman) - 3:23
 "Goodbye, Soul Shy" - (C. F. Turner) - 3:45
Side Two
 "Never Comin' Home" - (Randy Bachman) - 3:40
 "Be A Good Man" - (C. F. Turner) - 2:51
 "Long Way 'Round" - (C. F. Turner, Bachman) - 2:15
 "Another Way Out" - (Chad Allan, Randy Bachman) - 3:30
 "Waterloo Country" - (Chad Allan) - 5:00

Personnel 
 Randy Bachman - guitars, backing vocals
 Chad Allan - keyboards, backing vocals, lead vocals (tracks 2 & 10)
 C. F. Turner - bass, lead vocals (except tracks 2 & 10)
 Robbie Bachman - drums, backing vocals, percussion

Additional personnel 
 Tim Bachman - guitars, backing vocals (touring only)

The album reached #36 in Canada.

Canadian chart singles 
 "Rock and Roll Band" (1971) - #64 
 "Crazy Arms, Crazy Eyes" (1971) - #35 
 "Never Comin' Home" (1972) - #57 
 "Dunrobin's Gone" (1972) - #58   #5 CAN AC 
 "Another Way Out" (1972)

References

Bibliography

External links 
[ Allmusic.com entry]
 
 Entry at canadianbands.com

Bachman–Turner Overdrive
Canadian country rock groups
Musical groups from Winnipeg
Musical groups established in 1971
Musical groups disestablished in 1972
1971 establishments in Manitoba
1972 disestablishments in Canada